The Heckler & Koch HK433 is a modular assault rifle chambered for 5.56×45mm which combines features of the G36 and the HK416 families of assault rifles.

The HK433 was designed by Heckler & Koch to be familiar to operators with experience using the Heckler & Koch G36 and HK416 platforms. All controls are ambidextrous, and major components are modular, allowing for rifles to be configured in the field as needed.

The Heckler & Koch HK437 chambered in .300 Blackout and features a 7- and 9- inch barrel was originally announced alongside with the HK433 in 2017. In late 2022, the Ministry of the Interior, Municipal Affairs, Housing and Sports of the State of Schleswig-Holstein recently commissioned Heckler & Koch Germany to manufacture and supply the HK437. Apparently, the German Police in Schleswig-Holstein will get 60 rifles for training and 140 rifles for field operations.

History
The HK433 was first introduced at EnforceTac 2017 which went on the 1st and 2 March in Nürnberg, Bavaria, Germany, after the HK433 was shown to a select number of people at the earlier SHOT Show in January. Heckler & Koch offered the HK433 along with the HK416 as a candidate for the German Bundeswehr's competition to select a new assault rifle. The HK G36, the Bundeswehr's standard assault rifle since 1997, is to be phased out and a replacement is planned to be phased in from 2020.

Design

The HK433 has multiple barrel lengths ranging from 11-, 12.5-, 14.5-, 16.5-, 18.9- or 20-inch. All of the barrels are cold hammer forged, hard chrome lined with a 178 mm (1 in 7 inch) right-hand twist, six-groove rifling.

It features a short-stroke gas piston driven system similar to the Heckler & Koch G36 and HK416, with a gas block regulator adjustment located above the barrel. The non-reciprocating charging handle can be changed to operate from either side of the forestock of the rifle, but does not have a locking recess like the Heckler & Koch G3 family of weapons. All other primary controls are ambidextrous.

It has an interchangeable barrel system and a folding adjustable buttstock with a three position cheek riser and a paddle-style magazine release. The monolithic upper receiver is made of aluminium alloy, and the lower receiver is made of polymer.

The HK433 features a STANAG 4694 NATO Accessory Rail at 12 o'clock that is backwards-compatible with the STANAG 2324/MIL-STD-1913 Picatinny rail. At 6 o'clock it features the STANAG 2324/MIL-STD-1913 Picatinny rail. At the 3- and 9-o'clock positions the proprietary "HKey" accessory attachment system is used instead of the more commonly used M-LOK or KeyMod systems.

Variants 
Currently are three configurations of the HK433 and two configurations of the HK437 available:

Users 
 : Schleswig-Holstein Police - A contract of over 200 HK437 along with accessories was procured.

References

External links 
 Heckler & Koch: Product Overview - HK433
 H&K HK433 at SHOT Show 2017
 Heckler & Koch HK433 modular assault rifle

5.56 mm assault rifles
5.56×45mm NATO assault rifles
Short stroke piston firearms
Heckler & Koch rifles
Post–Cold War weapons of Germany